Antonio Rüdiger (born 3 March 1993) is a German professional footballer who plays as a centre-back for La Liga club Real Madrid and the Germany national team.

Rüdiger began his career at VfB Stuttgart, representing their reserves in 3. Liga and the first team in the Bundesliga. In 2015 he joined Roma, initially on loan and a year later for a €9 million fee. He was signed by Chelsea in 2017 for an estimated £27 million, where he won the FA Cup in his first season, followed by the UEFA Europa League in his second season, and the UEFA Champions League in 2021. In 2022, Rüdiger signed for European champions Real Madrid.

He made his international debut for Germany in May 2014. He was forced to miss UEFA Euro 2016 due to an injury suffered earlier in the season but he was part of the squad that won the 2017 FIFA Confederations Cup. He kept his spot in the squad for the 2018 World Cup, and later also took part at UEFA Euro 2020 and the 2022 World Cup.

Club career

VfB Stuttgart

On 23 July 2011, Rüdiger made his debut for VfB Stuttgart II in the 3. Liga against Arminia Bielefeld. Subsequently on 29 January 2012, Rüdiger made his Bundesliga debut for VfB Stuttgart's first team in a home professional match against Borussia Mönchengladbach, he was replaced by Raphael Holzhauser in the 79th minute of a 3–0 defeat. 

The following year in April 2013, Rüdiger extended his contract with Stuttgart until June 2017. On 1 June, he played in the final of the DFB-Pokal in a match lost 3–2 against Bayern Munich. He finished his second season in the first team with 24 appearances, plus 4 appearances and 2 goals in the reserve team.

Rüdiger finished the 2013–14 season with 35 appearances and 2 goals. He finished the following season with only 20 appearances and one assist due to various injuries.

Roma
On 19 August 2015, Serie A club Roma signed Rüdiger on loan from Stuttgart for €4 million. The clubs agreed on an optional €9 million transfer fee at the end of the one-year contract.

On 12 September, he made his debut in a 2–0 away win over Frosinone. On 9 January 2016 he scored his first goal for Roma in the 4th minute of a 1–1 home draw against Milan. He finished his season-long loan to Roma with 37 appearances and 2 goals. On 30 May, Roma officially signed Rüdiger from for €9 million + €0.5m bonuses on a four-year contract.

On 23 February 2017, as a substitute replacing Kostas Manolas in the 46th minute of a 1–0 home defeat against Villarreal in the round of 32 of the UEFA Europa League, he was sent off with a double yellow card in the 81st minute. On 30 April he was sent off with a red card in the 93rd minute in Derby della Capitale against Lazio in a 3–1 home defeat. Rüdiger finished his second season at Roma with 35 appearances and four assists.

Chelsea
On 9 July 2017, Rüdiger joined Chelsea from Roma for a reported initial fee of £29 million on a five-year deal. He was given the number 2 shirt. He made his debut on 6 August as a substitute replacing Marcos Alonso in the 79th minute in a 4–1 loss on penalties to Arsenal in the 2017 FA Community Shield. He made his Premier League debut six days later in a 3–2 defeat against Burnley at Stamford Bridge. He scored his first goal for Chelsea in the round of 16 of the EFL Cup in a 2–1 win over Everton, and his first league goal was the only one of a home win over Swansea City on 29 November 2017. On 20 October 2018, Rüdiger scored his first goal of the season, opening the scoring in a 2–2 home draw against Manchester United.

On 22 December 2019, Rüdiger made a complaint about racist abuse directed against him during the away match against Tottenham Hotspur, which received wide media coverage. It prompted a call for government action on racism in football. However, no evidence of racist abuse against Rüdiger was found after a police investigation with the police eventually dismissing the case.

On his 100th club appearance, he scored Chelsea's two goals, both headers assisted by Mason Mount in a 2–2 draw against Leicester City at the King Power Stadium on 1 February 2020. On 29 May 2021, Rüdiger won his first-ever UEFA Champions League after Chelsea beat Manchester City 1–0 in the final at the Estádio do Dragão. On 12 April 2022, he scored his first Champions League goal in a 3–2 away win over Real Madrid in the quarter-finals of the 2021–22 season; however, Chelsea were eliminated from the competition by losing 5–4 on aggregate. On 20 May, Rüdiger announced officially that he would leave Chelsea after five years.

Real Madrid
On 2 June 2022, Real Madrid announced that Rüdiger signed as a free agent for the club, penning a four-year deal starting with the 2022–23 season. On 20 June 2022, Rüdiger was unveiled as a new Real Madrid player. He was given the number 22 shirt. On 10 August, he made his debut for the club, coming off the bench in a 2–0 victory over Eintracht Frankfurt in the UEFA Super Cup. His first goal came on 11 September 2022, scoring the last goal in a 4–1 win over Mallorca. On 11 October, he scored a header in the 95th minute against Shakhtar Donetsk in the Champions League group stage, which allowed his side to draw 1–1 and qualify for the knockout phase. While jumping for the header, Rüdiger collided with Shakhtar goalkeeper Anatoliy Trubin and sustained a cut to the face that required 20 stitches.

International career
Rüdiger was eligible to play for Germany and Sierra Leone, his mother's homeland and was a member of several German national youth football teams up to the Germany U21 team.

He made his debut for the German national senior team on 13 May 2014 in a 0–0 draw against Poland. Although he was initially included in his nation's 23-man squad for UEFA Euro 2016, Rüdiger was later ruled out of the tournament due to injury, after tearing the anterior cruciate ligament in his right knee during a training session on 7 June.

Rüdiger was part of the German national squad which won the 2017 FIFA Confederations Cup in Russia. He played four matches in the tournament, including the 1–0 win over Chile in the final. On 8 October 2017, he headed his first international goal in a 5–1 home win over Azerbaijan in World Cup qualifying.

Rüdiger was included in Germany's final 23-man squad for the 2018 FIFA World Cup on 4 June 2018. On 23 June, he was picked up for the second group stage match against Sweden as first choice centre-back Mats Hummels suffered an injury, the game ended 2–1 win for Germany. Four days later, he did not play the last group stage match and his side were knocked out by South Korea after a 2–0 defeat. On 19 May 2021, Rüdiger was selected to the squad for the UEFA Euro 2020. He played every minute in the tournament for Germany as they were eliminated by England in the round of 16.

In November 2022, he was called up for the 2022 FIFA World Cup in Qatar. However, Germany were knocked out from the group stage, as they finished third behind Japan and Spain.

Style of play
Normally a centre-back, Rüdiger is a versatile defender, who is also capable of playing as a full-back on either flank. In 2015, ESPN described him as a "...tall, quick and athletic defender who is ... comfortable with the ball at his feet", also touting him as an "interesting prospect" who "...has all the necessary physical attributes to become a top-level centre-back." His Chelsea profile also describes him as a "tough tackler" and a "commanding presence in the air." In addition to his strong physical attributes and aggressive playing style, he is also known for his leadership qualities and passing ability.

Personal life
Rüdiger is a practising Muslim. He was born in Berlin to a black German father, Matthias, and a Sierra Leonean mother, Lily. He grew up in the Berlin neighbourhood of Neukölln and is the half-brother of Sahr Senesie. Rüdiger has often spoken out on racism in the sport, most notably after a match against Tottenham Hotspur on 24 February 2020. In 2021, he wrote an article for The Players' Tribune, entitled "This Article Will Not Solve Racism in Football," on the subject, discussing his experiences with racism throughout his life and career, and potential ways to fight it. He is married and having a son and a daughter.

Career statistics

Club

International

Germany score listed first, score column indicates score after each Rüdiger goal

Honours
Chelsea
FA Cup: 2017–18; runner-up: 2019–20, 2020–21, 2021–22
UEFA Champions League: 2020–21
UEFA Europa League: 2018–19
UEFA Super Cup: 2021
FIFA Club World Cup: 2021
EFL Cup runner-up: 2018–19, 2021–22

Real Madrid
UEFA Super Cup: 2022
FIFA Club World Cup: 2022

Germany
FIFA Confederations Cup: 2017

Individual
Fritz Walter Medal U19 Gold: 2012
UEFA Champions League Squad of the Season: 2020–21 
UEFA Champions League Team of the Season: 2021–22
PFA Team of the Year: 2021–22 Premier League
ESM Team of the Year: 2021–22

References

External links

Profile at the Real Madrid CF website

1993 births
Living people
Footballers from Berlin
German footballers
Association football defenders
SV Tasmania Berlin players
Hertha Zehlendorf players
Borussia Dortmund players
VfB Stuttgart II players
VfB Stuttgart players
A.S. Roma players
Chelsea F.C. players
Real Madrid CF players
3. Liga players
Bundesliga players
Serie A players
Premier League players
La Liga players
FA Cup Final players
UEFA Europa League winning players
UEFA Champions League winning players
Germany youth international footballers
Germany under-21 international footballers
Germany international footballers
2017 FIFA Confederations Cup players
2018 FIFA World Cup players
UEFA Euro 2020 players
2022 FIFA World Cup players
FIFA Confederations Cup-winning players
German expatriate footballers
Expatriate footballers in England
Expatriate footballers in Italy
Expatriate footballers in Spain
German expatriate sportspeople in England
German expatriate sportspeople in Italy
German expatriate sportspeople in Spain
German people of Sierra Leonean descent
German sportspeople of African descent
German Muslims